As the world's traditional automotive center, Detroit, Michigan, is an important source for business news.  The Detroit media are active in the community through such efforts as the Detroit Free Press high school journalism program and the Old Newsboys' Goodfellow Fund of Detroit. Wayne State University offers a widely respected journalism program.

Print 
The daily newspapers serving Detroit are the Detroit Free Press and The Detroit News, both broadsheet publications that are published together under a joint operating agreement. The Free Press is owned by the Gannett Company, while the News is owned by MediaNews Group. Other publications include weekly, monthly, and quarterly alternative media publications.

Daily 
Detroit Free Press
The Detroit News

Weekly 
Between the Lines
Crain's Detroit Business
The Detroit Jewish News
Latino Detroit
Metro Times
Michigan Chronicle
The Michigan Citizen
Model D Media
Detour Detroit
Downtown (Detroit) Monitor

Monthly 
DBusiness
Detroit Home
Hour Detroit
Metro Detroit Bride
Outlier Media
BLAC Detroit Magazine
Metro Parent
TBD Magazine
The HUB Detroit

Bi-monthly 
Ambassador

Quarterly 
INSPIREbride

Periodical 
Fifth Estate
The Furnace

Defunct 
Clear
Detroit Journal
Detroit Mirror
Detroit Sunday Journal
Detroit Times
Detroit Tribune
Orbit Magazine
StyleLine
Suznanie
Real Detroit Weekly

Radio 
Metro Detroit is currently the 12th largest radio market in the United States, as ranked by Nielsen Media Research; this ranking does not take into account Canadian audiences.

(*) - indicates a non-commercial station.

AM 
 560 WRDT Monroe (Christian radio)
 680 WNZK Dearborn Heights (Ethnic/talk)
 690 WNZK Dearborn Heights (Ethnic/talk)
 760 WJR Detroit (Talk radio/sports)
 910 WFDF Farmington Hills (Talk radio)
 950 WWJ Detroit (All-news radio)
 990 WDEO Ypsilanti (Christian/Catholic)*
 1030 WKEG Sterling Heights (Relevant Radio)*
 1050 WTKA Ann Arbor (Sports)
 1090 WCAR Livonia (Regional Mexican)
 1130 WDFN Detroit (All-news/BIN)
 1200 WMUZ Taylor (Inspirational)
 1270 WXYT Detroit (Sports)
 1310 WDTW Dearborn (Regional Mexican)
 1340 WCHB Royal Oak (Gospel)
 1400 WDTK Detroit (Conservative talk)
 1440 WMKM Inkster (Urban gospel)
 1460 WPON Walled Lake (Oldies)
 1500 WLQV Detroit (Christian radio)

FM 
 88.1 WHPR Highland Park (Urban oldies/talk)*
 88.1 WBFH Bloomfield Hills (Campus/variety)*
 88.1 WSDP Plymouth (Campus/AC)*
 88.1 WSMF Monroe (Christian contemporary)*
 88.3 WSHJ Southfield (Campus/urban)*
 88.3 WXOU Auburn Hills (Campus/variety)*
 88.3 WCBN-FM Ann Arbor (Campus/freeform)*
 89.1 WPHS Warren (Campus/variety)*
 89.1 WEMU Ypsilanti (Jazz/Blues/AAA)*
 89.3 WBLD Orchard Lake (Campus/variety)*
 89.5 WOVI Novi (Campus/variety)*
 89.5 WAHS Auburn Hills (Campus/variety)*
 90.3 KDTI Rochester Hills (K-Love Christmas)*
 90.9 WRCJ Detroit (Classical/jazz)*
 91.7 WUOM Ann Arbor (NPR)*
 92.3 WMXD Detroit (Urban AC)
 93.1 WDRQ Detroit (Country)
 93.5 WHMI Howell (Classic hits)
 94.3 WERW Monroe (AC/classic hits)
 94.7 WCSX Birmingham (Classic rock)
 95.5 WKQI Detroit (Contemporary hit radio)
 96.3 WDVD Detroit (Hot AC)
 97.1 WXYT Detroit (Sports)
 97.9 WJLB Detroit (Urban contemporary)
 98.7 WDZH Detroit (Alternative rock)
 99.5 WYCD Detroit (Country)
 100.3 WNIC Dearborn (Adult contemporary)
 101.1 WRIF Detroit (Active rock)
 101.9 WDET Detroit (NPR)*
 102.7 WDKL Mount Clemens (K-Love)*
 103.5 WMUZ-FM Detroit (Christian/Crawford)
 104.3 WOMC Detroit (Classic hits)
 105.1 WMGC-FM Detroit (Classic hip hop)
 105.9 WDMK Detroit (Urban AC)
 106.7 WLLZ Detroit (Classic rock)
 107.1 WQKL Ann Arbor (AAA)
 107.5 WGPR Detroit (Mainstream urban)

LPFM 
 96.7 WNUC-LP Detroit (Community)*
 96.7 WFCB-LP Ferndale (Community)*

Canadian AM 
 580 CKWW Windsor (Oldies)
 630 CFCO Chatham-Kent (Country)
 800 CKLW Windsor (Talk radio)
 1550 CBEF Windsor (Ici Radio-Canada Première)*

Canadian FM 
 88.7 CIMX-FM Windsor (Country)
 89.9 CBE-FM Windsor (CBC Music)*
 93.9 CIDR-FM Windsor Contemporary hit radio)
 95.9 CJWF-FM Windsor (Country)
 96.7 CHYR-FM Leamington (Hot AC)
 97.5 CBEW-FM Windsor (CBC Radio One)*
 99.1 CJAM-FM Windsor (Campus/variety)*
 100.7 CKUE-FM-1 Windsor (Adult hits)
 102.3 CINA-FM Windsor (Multilingual)
 103.9 CJBC-FM-1 Windsor (Ici Musique)*
 105.5 CBEF-2-FM Windsor (Ici Radio-Canada Première)*

Notes

TV 

The Detroit television market is the 12th largest in the United States, and it has additional viewers in Ontario, Canada (Windsor and its surrounding area on broadcast and cable). Detroit is home to owned-and-operated stations of CBS, Fox, and Daystar and two station duopolies owned by Paramount Global and E.W. Scripps Company.

Full-power 
 2 WJBK Detroit (Fox)*
 4 WDIV-TV Detroit (NBC)
 7 WXYZ-TV Detroit (ABC)
 20 WMYD Detroit (Independent)
 31 WPXD-TV Ann Arbor (Ion Television)
 38 WADL Mount Clemens (MyNetworkTV)
 50 WKBD-TV Detroit (The CW)
 56 WTVS Detroit (PBS)
 62 WWJ-TV Detroit (CBS)*

Low-power 
 3  WHNE-LD Detroit (TheGrioTV)
 18 WDWO-CD Detroit (Vision Latina)
 19 WUDL-LD Detroit (Infomercials)
 23 WUDT-LD Detroit (Daystar)*
 28 WLPC-CD Redford (The Impact Network)
 33 WHPS-CD Detroit (Independent/WHPR-FM/WVIE)

(*) - indicates channel is a network owned-and-operated station.

Cable 
Bally Sports Detroit
Michigan Channel
Michigan Government Television

Canadian viewership 

Most of Metro Detroit receives stations from adjacent Windsor, Ontario, most notably, CBC Television owned-and-operated station CBET-DT. Conversely, multiple television stations in Detroit enjoy Canadian viewership and consider the market as part of their primary audience.

Internet
 The Detroit Cast
 Sports Radio Detroit

Media corporations
 Adell Broadcasting Corporation
 Detroit Media Partnership
 The Word Network
 Graham Media Group

See also

List of people from Detroit
List of films set in Detroit
Media in Windsor, Ontario

References

Bibliography

External links
City of Detroit Culture
Knight Wallace Fellows at Michigan
No Kiddie Without a Christmas — WBGU-TV documentary about the Goodfellows and Old Newsboys Goodfellow Fund

 
Detroit
Radio stations in Detroit